Bloody Radio is a studio album by American hip hop group Grayskul. It was released on Rhymesayers Entertainment in 2007. "Scarecrow" was released as a single from the album.

Background
The album sees Onry Ozzborn rapping under the guise of Count Draven and JFK going by the moniker Count Magnus. Production is handled by Coley Cole, Sapient, Smoke, and Mr. Hill, among others.

Critical reception

Nick Marx of Tiny Mix Tapes wrote, "Onry and JFK ground their abstractions throughout in a coherent attack on the contemporary hip-hop landscape." He added, "like any artist well-versed in the conventions of horror, the duo knows how to deliver superficial schlock while slipping in a message." Marisa Brown of AllMusic commented that "they're interested in the extremes of human experience, as if they don't really believe what they're saying, but that they like the way it sounds."

Track listing

Personnel
Credits adapted from liner notes.

 Onry Ozzborn – vocals
 JFK – vocals
 North Czar – production (1, 8)
 Coley Cole – production (2, 5)
 Bean One – production (3)
 J. "Candidt" Page – additional vocals (4)
 Smoke – production (4, 6, 7, 11)
 Cage – vocals (5)
 A.D.F. – additional vocals (5)
 Andrea Zollo – vocals (6)
 Slug – vocals (9)
 Aesop Rock – vocals (9), production (12)
 Sapient – production (9, 10, 15)
 Pigeon John – vocals (11)
 Toni Hill – vocals (11)
 Aleksandra Weil – additional vocals (12)
 Mr. Hill – production (14)
 The Gigantics – production (15)
 DJ Wicked – turntables
 Aaron Angus – recording, mixing

References

External links
 

2007 albums
Grayskul albums
Rhymesayers Entertainment albums
Albums produced by Aesop Rock